Euchlorostola corydon is a moth of the subfamily Arctiinae. It was described by Herbert Druce in 1884. It is found in Mexico and Guatemala.

References

Arctiinae
Moths described in 1884